Sangguniang Kabataan (abbreviated as SK) is a council meant to represent the youth in each barangay in the Philippines. It was put "on hold", but not quite abolished, prior to the 2013 barangay elections.  In January 2016, the Sangguniang Kabataan Reform Act was signed into law which made some significant changes to the SK and initially scheduled new elections for October 2016. In March 2017, the elections were postponed anew to May 2018.

The SK Chairman leads the Sangguniang Kabataan.  A Local Youth Development Council (LYDC) composed of representatives of different local youth groups supports the SK and its programs.

The Sangguniang Kabataan is the successor of the Kabataang Barangay (KB) which was abolished by the Local Government Code of 1991. The author, Senator Aquilino Pimentel Jr. abolished KB because of allegations that this organization faced.

Function and structure
Each Barangay houses a Sangguniang Kabataan composed of a chairman, seven members, a secretary, and a treasurer. The Kagawads, or councilors, approve resolutions and appropriate money allotted to the council. The Chairman automatically sits on the barangay council as an ex officio member and is automatically chairman of the Committee on Youth and Sports, one of the standing committees of the barangay council.

The council represents youth who have resided in their barangay for at least one year and registered to vote. It leads the local youth programs.

Members of the SK receive payment for serving on the council. Under the Local Government Code, only the SK Chairman receives money but in some areas the practice is that the chairman shares his payment with other members of the SK council. In one barangay, each SK member received 500 pesos per month from the chairman.

Local Youth Development Council
Under the 2016 reform, a new Local Youth Development Council was formed to support the SK programs and to be composed of representatives from different youth organizations in the community including student councils, church and youth faith groups, youth-serving organizations, and community-based youth groups. 

"The LYDC aims to harmonize, broaden and strengthen all programs and initiatives of the local government and non-governmental organizations for the youth sector", said Senator Bam Aquino in October 2015, then chairman of the Senate Committee on Youth and co-author of the reform act.

SK Federations
Every Sangguniang Kabataan is part of a municipal or city SK association, which are in turn members of a provincial SK association. A barangay's SK Chairman represents the barangay in the municipal or city association.  The presidents of the city and municipal federation are, in turn, members of the provincial or metropolitan associations, all of which have their own elected president as well. The presidents of independent cities' and provinces' associations compose the membership in the national association and elect the national president who automatically sits on the National Youth Commission.

History

Predecessors

The SK developed out of the Kabataang Barangay, established during martial law by President Ferdinand Marcos.  Marcos established the KB in 1975 to give youth a chance to be involved in community affairs and to provide the government means to inform youth of the government's development efforts. His daughter Imee Marcos was chairman.

Controversy surrounded the KB, including the enforcement of authoritarian rule among youth, opposition of militant youth activity, and the KB's failure to develop youth as a responsive collective. Since then, the KB grew less popular among youth and instead student activism became the trend in youth participation in the country. In June 1986, a study was conducted on the KB and included the following recommendations: abolish the KB; create a National Youth Commission (NYC); establish a National Youth Assembly; and set up genuine youth representation in government. Youth consultations were held, and the KB was abolished by the government. However, then-president Corazon Aquino had already established the Presidential Council for Youth Affairs (PCYA) instead of NYC, which was successful in coordinating with the youth federations to develop future national leaders, but lacked the powers envisioned for the NYC because PCYA merely coordinated with youth groups. A proposal was then crafted by the Congress youth representatives and PCYA's technical committee in 1989 to 1990.

The proposal that created the Katipunan ng Kabataan (KK) and Sangguniang Kabataan (SK) was incorporated into the 1991 Local Government Code (known as Local Autonomy Act or Republic Act No. 7160). It formally abolished the KB and created the KK and SK. The KK includes all Filipino citizens, age 10 to 18 years, who reside in each barangay for at least six months and are registered in the official barangay list. The SK is the governing body of the KK, a set of youth leaders elected by the KK members to represent them and deliver youth-focused services in the barangay.

The age range of the youth eligible for the KK and SK was reduced to 15 from below 18 due to the changes by Republic Act No. 9164, which amended the Local Autonomy Act, in 2002.

Sangguniang Kabataan reform

SKs developed a poor reputation. One youth advocate said he was dissuaded from running for an SK because "Aside from the lack of concrete legislative and youth development programs, I have heard of certain issues raised against the SK like corruption, nepotism, and recurring programs focusing on sports festivals and pageantry only."  A 2007 study by UNICEF and the Department of the Interior and Local Government said, "The SK's performance for the past ten years has been generally weak. This is especially true in terms of coming up with legislations, promoting the development of young people, submitting reports and holding consultations with their constituents."

Because of concerns that the SK is a "breeding ground for political dynasty and exposing the youth to corruption and the practice of traditional politicians" known colloquially as trapos, Republic Act No. 10632 was enacted in 2013 to (a) postpone the scheduled October 2013 SK elections until some time between October 28, 2014 and February 23, 2015 and (b) leave vacant all the SK positions until new officers are elected. The bill explicitly prohibits the appointing of officials to fill the vacant positions.  Sen. Francis Escudero said the vacancies would technically abolish the SK.  During this time, the Commission on Elections (Comelec) and the Department of the Interior and Local Government (DILG) issued regulations on how the barangays are to use the 10% of Internal Revenue Allotment set aside for SK activities and mandated the creation in each barangay of a "Task Force on Youth Development". In the place of SKs, ad hoc youth committees were formed.

In January 2015, as the February 23 deadline approached for the date of the postponed elections, the Philippine House of Representatives unanimously passed a reform bill. Among the reforms are the raising of the age of SK officials from between 15 and 17 years old to between 18 and 21; the raising of the age of voters from between 15 and 17 to between 15 and 21; an anti-dynasty provision that forbids candidates from having a relative in public office that is within the second degree of affinity; and provisions to increase SKs' fiscal autonomy.  Immediately after passing the reform bill, the Philippine House passed a bill further postponing the SK elections from February 2015 to October 2016 to be held at the same time as the barangay elections of 2016.  In March 2015, a law postponing the elections to 2016 was signed by President Aquino. However, the elections were eventually held in May 2018.

On January 15, 2016, the Sangguniang Kabataan Reform Act (Republic Act No. 10742) was signed into law which made some significant changes to the SK.  It changed the age of the council from 15 to 17 years old to 18 to 24 years old (Special Child, Child With Disablity)</ citation needed /> and it forbids individuals from seeking a youth council appointment who are closer than the second degree of consanguinity (having the same grandparents) from any elected or appointed official in the same area. It is the first Philippine law with an anti-political dynasty restriction for elected positions, as permitted by the 1987 Philippine Constitution. The reform also created a Local Youth Development Council to support the SK programs, composed of representatives from different youth organizations in the community including student councils, church and youth faith groups, youth-serving organizations, and community-based youth groups.

SK elections
Since 1992, there have been three simultaneous nationwide SK elections held in the Philippines which each term lasting from three to five years due to amendment of the regular 3-year term of the council.

Except in 1992 and 1996, Sangguniang Kabataan elections have been synchronized with the barangay elections starting in 2002, but in 2013, only barangay elections were held. The term limit for Sangguniang Kabataan officials is usually three years but since the first election, there have been extension of terms ranging from one to two years more in office.

 1992 Philippine Sangguniang Kabataan election on December 4, 1992
 1996 Philippine Sangguniang Kabataan election on May 6, 1996
 2002 Philippine barangay and Sangguniang Kabataan elections on July 15, 2002
 2007 Philippine barangay and Sangguniang Kabataan elections on October 29, 2007
 2010 Philippine barangay and Sangguniang Kabataan elections on October 25, 2010 
 2018 Philippine barangay and Sangguniang Kabataan elections on May 14, 2018
 2022 Philippine barangay and Sangguniang Kabataan elections on December 5, 2022

See also
Youth council
Youth politics

References

External links
 Sangguniang Kabataan (SK) Constitution and By-Laws 
 Sangguniang Kabataan Reform Act on Gov.ph

Katipunan ng Kabataan
Youth councils
Barangays of the Philippines
Legislatures of the Philippines
Local government in the Philippines
Tagalog words and phrases